The Spanish World Scrabble Championship is an international Scrabble tournament organised by the Federación Internacional de Scrabble en Español (FISE). The competition takes place each year in a different city in a Spanish-speaking country. The first championship was held in Madrid in Spain. The number of players has varied, from 32 players in 1997 to 120 in 2018.

Players only play with two players at a board, never more, and the tournament uses a Swiss tournament system to decide who plays against whom. In 2007, the players played 18 games with the winner being Benjamín Olaizola of Venezuela with 14 wins from 18 games. Since then, the number of games has gradually increased, reaching 24 in 2016. Internationally, the players are rated by the Elo system.

List of winners

Multiple winners

(3) Luis Picciochi : 2009, 2010, 2018 – Only person to win 3 titles.
(2) Joan R. Manchado  : 1997, 2003
(2) Benjamín Olaizola : 2001, 2007
(2) Enric Hernández : 2006, 2008
(2) Airán Pérez : 2013, 2015

Winners by country

 : 7 wins
 : 7 wins
 : 5 wins
 : 1 win
 : 1 win
 : 1 win
 : 1 win

References
 Spanish World Scrabble Championships on the official site of the Federación internacional de Scrabble en español
 Spanish World Scrabble Championships on LeSablier.be
 Spanish World Scrabble Championships on Ortograf.com

Recurring events established in 1997
Spanish
World Scrabble Championship